Joseph Stanley Koziol (July 29, 1965 – March 3, 2014)  was an American soccer midfielder who played professionally in the Major Indoor Soccer League, National Professional Soccer League and American Professional Soccer League.  He also competed with the Puerto Rico national football team in 1992.

Career

Youth
Koziol, the older brother of Joe Koziol, attended Loyola University Maryland, playing on the men's soccer team from 1983 to 1987.  He holds the school's career assists record and was a 1986 and 1987 Second Team All American. In 1994, Koziol was inducted into the Loyola Hall of Fame.

Professional
In 1988, Koziol began his professional career with the Maryland Bays of the American Soccer League. In 1989, he moved to the Boston Bolts where he spent two seasons.  In the 1989 season, the Bolts played in the American Professional Soccer League. In 1989, Koziol moved indoors with the Baltimore Blast of the Major Indoor Soccer League.  On November 4, 1990, Koziol signed with the Hershey Impact of the National Professional Soccer League. He played for the Canton Invaders during the 1992-93 NPSL season.

In 1996, he played for the Central Jersey Riptide of the USISL Pro League.  On July 17, 1996, the MetroStars called up Koziol for an exhibition with the Italian U-23 national team.

International
Koziol competed for the Puerto Rico national football team during Puerto Rico's qualification games for the 1994 FIFA World Cup.

Personal life 

He died on March 3, 2014, following a short battle with leukemia. at the age of 48.

External links
 MISL: Joe Koziol
 FIFA: Stan Koziol

References

2014 deaths
1965 births
American soccer players
American Soccer League (1988–89) players
American Professional Soccer League players
Baltimore Blast (1980–1992) players
Baltimore Bays (1993–1998) players
Boston Bolts players
Canton Invaders players
Central Jersey Riptide players
Loyola Greyhounds men's soccer players
Major Indoor Soccer League (1978–1992) players
Maryland Bays players
National Professional Soccer League (1984–2001) players
USL Second Division players
Puerto Rican footballers
Puerto Rico international footballers
Soccer players from New Jersey
Sportspeople from Clifton, New Jersey
Place of death missing
Association football midfielders